Phragmataecia minor is a species of moth of the family Cossidae. It is found in Bangladesh, China (Lingping) and possibly Myanmar.

References

Moths described in 1879
Phragmataecia